This is a list of companies based in the  Arab world by country:

Algeria
Bahrain
Comoros
Djibouti
Egypt
Iraq
Jordan
Kuwait
Lebanon
Libya
Mauritania
Morocco
Oman
Palestine
Qatar
Saudi Arabia
Somalia
Sudan
Syria
Tunisia
United Arab Emirates
Yemen

Largest arab companies
The following is a list of companies based in the Arab World having the greatest market capitalization. This list is based on the Forbes Middle East Top 100 rankings. All figures are in USD billions.

See also
 List of Arab organizations
 Lists of companies

References

Lists of companies
Companies
Companies